The Hanoi–Haiphong railway is a railway line serving the country of Vietnam.

References

See also 
 List of railway lines in Vietnam
 Kunming–Haiphong railway

Railway lines in Vietnam
Metre gauge railways in Vietnam
Transport in Vietnam
Articles containing video clips